Eupithecia latipennata is a moth in the  family Geometridae. It is found on Madeira.

References

Moths described in 1914
latipennata
Moths of Africa